Loricariichthys hauxwelli, one of a number of Loricariichthys species commonly known as Shitari, is a species of catfish in the family Loricariidae. It is endemic to Peru, where it occurs in the Ampiyacu River basin. The species reaches  in length and is believed to be a facultative air-breather.

References 

Loricariini
Fish described in 1915
Endemic fauna of Peru
Taxa named by Henry Weed Fowler

Freshwater fish of Peru